Deaf people are typically defined as those who have profound hearing impairment in both ears as a result of either acquired or congenital hearing loss. Such people may be associated with deaf culture. Deafness (little to no hearing) is distinguished from partial hearing loss or damage (such as tinnitus), which is less severe impairment in one or both sides. The definition of deafness varies across countries, cultures, and time, though the World Health Organization classes profound hearing loss as the failure to hear a sound of 90 decibels or louder in a hearing test.

In addition to those with profound hearing loss, people without profound hearing loss may also identify as deaf, often where the person was raised within a deaf community and for whom sign language is their first language. Those who have mostly lived as a hearing person and acquire deafness briefly, due to a temporary illness or shortly before death, for example, are not typically classed as deaf people.

Deaf educators and organizers 

 Ferdinand Berthier, French intellectual, published several articles, first deaf person to receive the French Legion of Honour, founder of world's first deaf organization
 Julia Brace (1807–1884), early American deaf-blind student at the Hartford School for the Deaf
 Laura Bridgman, (1829–1889), American, first deaf-blind student of Dr. Samuel Howe at the Perkins School for the Blind
 Teresa de Cartagena, Spanish conversa nun and mystic author of the 15th century who became deaf in later life. The first mystic author in Spanish.
 Laurent Clerc (1785–1869), student and teacher (1798–1816) at the Paris deaf school of the Abbé de l'Épée; accompanied Thomas Gallaudet to America to teach deaf children. Co-founded the first deaf school in North America in 1817 in Hartford, Connecticut.
 Alice Cogswell, the first deaf student at American School for the Deaf
 Robert R. Davila, the ninth president of Gallaudet University
 Pierre Desloges (1742–?), French deaf writer and bookbinder, first known deaf person to publish a book
 Gilbert Eastman (1934–2016), American educator, actor, playwright, author, and television host
 Jane Fernandes, the first Deaf woman to serve as president of an American college or university at Guilford College (2014-2021) in Greensboro, NC and the first Deaf woman to head a school for the Deaf Hawaii School for the Deaf and Blind (1990-1995) Currently president of Antioch College in Yellow Springs, Ohio
 Andrew Foster, (1925–1987), American educator, the first Black deaf person to earn a bachelor's degree from Gallaudet College, Christian missionary to Africa
 T. Alan Hurwitz, the tenth president of Gallaudet University and former Vice President of National Technical Institute for the Deaf
 Casar Jacobson, Norwegian-Canadian first-ever deaf winner of Miss Canada (2013), a disability rights activist and the UN Woman Youth Champion.
 I. King Jordan, the first deaf president (eighth overall) of Gallaudet University
 Liisa Kauppinen (born 1939), Finnish human rights activist, former president of the World Federation of the Deaf
 Helen Keller, American deaf-blind writer, lecturer, and actress
 Dorothy Miles, deaf poet and activist
 Lawrence R. Newman, deaf educator and activist, and served two terms as President of the National Association of the Deaf
 Michael Ndurumo, a deaf educator from Kenya, the third deaf person from Africa to be awarded a PhD
 Marie Jean Philip, a teacher and leading international advocate for the right to sign language
 George Veditz, the former president of the National Association of the Deaf, and one of the first people to film sign language

Actors
 Sean Berdy, actor and comedian
 Linda Bove, actress, known particularly for the role of Linda the Librarian on the children's television program Sesame Street
 Bruce Willis, American actor, producer, and singer, 70% deaf in his left ear
 Shelley Beattie, American actress and bodybuilder
 Deanne Bray, actress who played the lead role on Sue Thomas: F.B.Eye
 Millie Bobby Brown, an actress from Stranger Things, totally deaf in her right ear
 Stephen Colbert, actor, comedian, and talk show host, totally deaf in his right ear.
 Aryana Engineer, actress
 Lauren Ridloff, an American actress, played the role of Connie (a deaf character) in the ninth season of The Walking Dead. In Eternals, released in 2021, she played the deaf superhero Makkari.
 Lou Ferrigno, American actor and bodybuilder
 Phyllis Frelich, American actress, Best Actress in a Broadway play:  Children of a Lesser God 1980
 Russell Harvard, actor whose first language is American Sign Language
 Bob Hiltermann, actor, writer, director, and musician
 Emilio Insolera, Italian actor and director of Sign Gene
Troy Kotsur (Best Supporting Actor) for his role in "CODA"
 Ryan Lane, actor and model
 Gabriella Leon, English actress
 Marlee Matlin, first deaf person to win an Academy Award (Best Actress) for her role in Children of a Lesser God
 Leslie Nielsen, Canadian-American comedic actor who was legally deaf 
 Terrylene Sacchetti, actress
 Howie Seago, actor and director
 Millicent Simmonds, deaf actress
 Shoshannah Stern, actress in Jericho and Weeds whose first language is American Sign Language
 Alexandria Wailes, deaf actress, dancer, and educator

Artists
 Chuck Baird, (1947–2012), American painter and performer, one of the founding members of the De'Via Deaf art movement
 Bernard Bragg, performer, writer, director, poet, and artist
 John Brewster Jr. (1766–1854) portraitist and miniaturist in Connecticut, Massachusetts and Maine in the Federalist period in America
 Thomas Davidson, RA an English painter specializing in historical naval scenes (1842–1919)
 Walter Geikie, Scottish painter
 Francisco Goya (1746-1828) Spanish painter, became deaf at age 47.
 David Hockney (b. 1937), British painter
 Regina Olson Hughes, American Illustrator
 Jan (born 1939) Spanish comic artist. Deaf since age 6.
 Betty G. Miller, American artist
 Maurycy Minkowski, deaf Polish Jewish artist (1881/2–1930)
 Juan Fernández Navarrete, Spanish Mannerist painter (1526–79)
 Albert Newsam (1809–1864) lithographer, and student of Catlin
 Will J. Quinlan, American artist, etcher, painter
 Slava Raškaj (1877–1906), Croatian painter
 Granville Redmond, American painter, actor
 Alfred Thomson, an English artist and Olympic Gold Medalist (1894–1979)
 Douglas Tilden, American sculptor
 Frederick LaMonto, American sculptor, artist. (1921-1981)

Musicians
 Ludwig van Beethoven, German composer and pianist, who acquired almost complete deafness by age 44.
 Mabel Hubbard Bell, wife of telephone inventor Alexander Graham Bell
 William Boyce, a British composer who acquired deafness in his late 40s
 Sean Forbes, American musician, songwriter, and rapper
 TL Forsberg, American avant-garde rock singer who identifies as deaf
 Evelyn Glennie, Scottish percussionist, won Grammy for Best Musician in a Recording 1989: Bartok's Sonata for Two Pianos and Percussion
 Mandy Harvey, American jazz singer and a finalist of America's Got Talent (season 12)
 Geraldine Lawhorn, musician, actress, instructor and first deaf-blind African-American person to earn a college degree
 Signmark, Finnish rap artist
 Bedřich Smetana, Czech composer who became completely deaf at age 50
 Mariko Takamura, deaf Japanese musician

Scientists
 Guillaume Amontons, French inventor and physicist
 Annie Jump Cannon, Harvard astronomer recognized for her work in stellar classification
 Thomas Edison, American businessperson and inventor
 John Goodricke, (1764–1786), English astronomer
 Nansie S. Sharpless, American biochemist
 Henrietta Swan Leavitt, American astronomer
 Konstantin Tsiolkovsky, Russian astronomer

Sports
Cecilia Hanhikoski, Finnish snowboarder and futsal player
Ashley Fiolek, American motocross racer and stunt actress
Yehuda Gruenfeld, Israeli chess grandmaster
Gerry Hughes, British sports sailor
Jim Kyte, Canadian hockey player
Rebecca Macree, British squash player
Robert Marchand, American masters cyclist
Caleb McDuff, British go-kart racer
Mike Murphy, American athletic trainer
Kitty O'Neil, American race driver and stunt actress
Aimee Walker Pond, American gymnast
Marie Roethlisberger, American gymnast
Lana Skeledžija, Croatian sport shooter
Melanie Stabel, German sport shooter
Joe Swail, Northern Irish snooker player
Laurentia Tan, Singaporean Paralympic equestrian
Tone Tangen Myrvoll, Norwegian runner, skier, and orienteer
Margareta Trnková-Hanne, Czech sprinter and tennis player
Ildikó Újlaky-Rejtő, Hungarian fencer and Olympic champion
Boris Verlinsky, Ukrainian-Russian chess master
Melinda Vernon, Australian distance runner, triathlete and swimmer
Heidi Zimmer, American mountaineer

American football
Albert Berg, American footballer player, coach, and writer
Derrick Coleman, American fullback and Super Bowl champion
Gilbert O. Erickson, American college footballer player and photographer
Bonnie Sloan, American defensive tackle and first deaf person drafted to the National Football League
Kenny Walker, American gridiron player and first deaf player in the Canadian Football League
Blaise Winter, American coach and former defensive end in the NFL

Association football
Eunate Arraiza, Spanish defender/midfielder
Cliff Bastin, English forward for Arsenal
Jozo Bogdanović, Croatian forward
Stan Burton, English winger
Memnos Costi, English footballer and television presenter
Damir Desnica, Croatian forward
Matthew Eby, American defender/midfielder
Thomas Elliott, British forward
Albert Gardner, English midfielder
Danielle Gibbons, English goalkeeper 
Andy Greig, Scottish goalkeeper
Stefan Markolf, German defender
Athiel Mbaha, Namibian goalkeeper and international at the Africa Cup of Nations
Simon Ollert, German forward
John Tosswill, English forward

Athletics
Nele Alder-Baerens, German distance runner
Natasha Bacchus, Canadian sprinter
Dean Barton-Smith, Australian decathlete 
Edie Boyer, American discus thrower
Suslaidy Girat, Cuban sprinter and jumper
Emilija Manninen, Estonian hurdler
Marie-Paule Miller, French heptathlete
Amy-Lea Mills, Australian javelin thrower
Dawn Moncrieffe, Canadian middle-distance runner
Trude Raad, Norwegian thrower
Ruth Taubert Seeger, American sprinter and jumper
Evgenii Shvetcov, Russian Paralympic runner
Vyacheslav Skomorokhov, Ukrainian-Soviet hurdler
Gerhard Sperling, East German racewalker
Beryl Wamira, Kenyan sprinter
Rita Windbrake, German runner

Baseball
Michael Cuddyer, American outfielder in MLB during 2001–2015; two-time MLB All-Star
Dummy Deegan, American pitcher for the New York Giants in 1901
Ed Dundon, American pitcher and first deaf player in MLB, in 1883–1884
Tyson Gillies, Canadian outfielder and Pan American Games gold medalist
Dummy Hoy, American center fielder and most accomplished deaf player in MLB, during 1888–1902
Yuya Ishii, Japanese pitcher in Nippon Professional Baseball
Dummy Leitner, American pitcher in MLB during 1901–1902
Thomas Lynch, American pitcher for the Chicago White Stockings (NL) in 1884
Curtis Pride, American outfielder in MLB during 1993–2006; college baseball coach
Dick Sipek, American outfielder for the Cincinnati Reds in 1945
Dummy Stephenson, American outfielder for the Philadelphia Phillies in 1892
Dummy Taylor, American pitcher in MLB during 1901–1908

Basketball
Lance Allred, American forward and first legally-deaf NBA player
Buffalo Silents, a 1920s American all-deaf team
Tamika Catchings, American small forward, 2012 WNBA champion and four-time Olympic gold medallist
Wissam Constantin, Lebanese forward and first deaf player in the Lebanese Basketball League
Cecilia Ferm, Swedish international player
Emma Meesseman, Belgian player in the WNBA
Ronda Jo Miller, American player and first deaf woman to try out for the WNBA
Miha Zupan, Slovenian power forward

Cricket
Anjan Bhattacharjee, Indian first-class bowler for Bihar
Lance Cairns, New Zealand all-rounder and international test player
John Hodgkins, English first-class all-rounder for Nottinghamshire
Charlie McLeod, Australian all-rounder and international test player
Imran Sheikh, former captain of the deaf India national team
Baba Sidhaye, Indian first-class all-rounder and first national-level deaf-mute player
Umesh Valjee, former captain of the deaf England national team

Swimming
Cindy-Lu Bailey, Australian swimmer and 29-time Deaflympic medalist
Peggy de Villiers, South African swimmer and Deaflympian
Natalia Deeva, Belarusian swimmer and four-time Deaflympic champion
Gertrude Ederle, American Olympic medalist and the first woman to swim the English channel
Jeff Float, American swimmer and Olympic and world champion
Reed Gershwind, American swimmer and 30-time Deaflympic medalist
Danielle Joyce, British swimmer and two-time Deaflympic champion
Matthew Klotz, American swimmer and deaf world record holder
Cornell Loubser, South African swimmer and Deaflympic medalist
Jill Diana Lovett, British swimmer and Deaflympian
Rebecca Meyers, American swimmer and visually-impaired Paralympic champion
Linda Neumann, German swimmer and Deaflympic medalist
Terence Parkin, South African swimmer and Olympic and world medalist
Alexandra Polivanchuk, Swedish swimmer and deaf world record holder
Anna Polivanchuk, Swedish swimmer and deaf world record holder, sister of Alexandra
Taranath Narayan Shenoy, Indian deaf-blind open water swimmer and swimmer of the English channel

Tennis
Vidisha Baliyan, Indian tennis player and beauty pageant contestant
Emily Hangstefer, American tennis player and Deaflympian
Jafreen Shaik, Indian tennis player and Deaflympian
Mario Kargl, Austrian tennis player and former deaf world champion
Lee Duck-hee, South Korean tennis player and twice competitor on the ATP Challenger Tour
Gábor Máthé, Hungarian champion and Deaflympic champion
Angela Mortimer, British tennis player and multiple Grand Slam winner
Barbara Oddone, Italian tennis player and multiple Deaflympic champion
Prithvi Sekhar, Indian tennis player and Deaflympian

Winter sports
Jenny Berrigan, American snowboarder
Brenda Davidson, Canadian curler
Emma Logan, Canadian curler
Jakub Nosek, Czech bobsledder
Margarita Noskova, Russian snowboarder
Anna Surmilina, Russian snowboarder
Jack Ulrich, Canadian ice hockey player
Lauren Weibert, American snowboarder

Writers
 Kathleen L. Brockway, author, historian, and deaf rights' activist
 John Lee Clark, American deafblind poet
 Willy Conley, playwright, actor, photographer 
 Eugen Relgis, Romanian humanist writer and political activist
 Michael Chorost, writer and technologist who wrote on his experience of cochlear implants
 Harold MacGrath, American author
 Pierre de Ronsard, French poet
 Laura C. Redden Searing,(1893–1923), Civil war journalist, biographer, and poet
 Louise Stern, writer and artist
 Ted Supalla, researcher and professor
 Clayton Valli, deaf linguist and ASL poet

Other occupations
 Dimitra Arapoglou, a deaf member of the Greek parliament, from 2007 to 2009
Alice of Battenberg, a German Princess in the 19th and 20th century
 Marla Berkowitz, ASL interpreter; as of 2020, the only Deaf ASL interpreter in the US state of Ohio
 Earnest Elmo Calkins, a deaf American advertising executive who pioneered the use of art in advertising
 Nyle DiMarco, season 22 Dancing with the Stars champion and 2015 winner of America's Next Top Model
 Haben Girma, first deafblind graduate of Harvard Law School
 Claudia L. Gordon, lawyer
Helen Heckman, dancer
 Henrietta Howard, Countess of Suffolk
 Juliette Gordon Low, founder of the Girl Scouts of the USA who became completely deaf age 17.
 Mojo Mathers (b. 1966), New Zealand politician
 Florence Lewis May, American textile curator
 Roger Demosthenes O'Kelly (b. 1880), deaf-blind black lawyer, Yale alumnus
 Dame Kathleen Ollerenshaw (b. 1912), British mathematician and politician
 François d'Orléans, Prince of Joinville, French prince and naval commander
Opu Daeng Risaju, Indonesian independence activist.
 Andrew Phillips, lawyer
Rikki Poynter, deaf YouTuber and activist.
 Punk Chef, celebrity deaf chef from the UK
 Elizabeth Steel, the earliest record of a deaf person in Australia
 Sue Thomas, first deaf person to work as an undercover investigator doing lip-reading of suspects for the Federal Bureau of Investigation
 Konstantin Tsiolkovsky, Russian rocket scientist and pioneer of space exploration studies
 Heather Whitestone, first deaf woman to win the title of Miss America
 Nellie Zabel Willhite, pilot
 David Wright, South African-born British poet
 Judith Wright, Australian poet

Fictional characters
 Connie, a deaf character that fights zombies in AMC's The Walking Dead series.
 Echo, a deaf Native American martial artist.
 Drury Lane, a deaf detective written by Ellery Queen.
 Jade Lovall, a partially deaf nurse in the BBC medical drama Casualty
 Gabriella, a deaf mermaid and one of Ariel's friends in The Little Mermaid.
 Hawkeye (Clint Barton), a deaf archer from marvel comics

See also
 List of deaf firsts

References

Further reading
 Lang, Harry G. Fighting in the Shadows: Untold Stories of Deaf People in the Civil War (Washington: Gallaudet University Press, 2017), xv, 255 pp.
Sonnenstrahl, Deborah M. Deaf Artists in America, Colonial to Contemporary. San Diego: Dawnsign Press, 2002.